The 1943 Prince Edward Island general election was held in the Canadian province of Prince Edward Island on September 15, 1943.

The governing Liberals of Premier J. Walter Jones lost seven seats to the Progressive Conservatives led by former Premier William J.P. MacMillan, but were able to retain  a strong majority in the Legislature. Jones became Premier in May 1943 following the elevation of his predecessor Thane Campbell to the position of Chief Justice of the Supreme Court of Prince Edward Island.

This election featured the first appearance of the democratic socialist Co-operative Commonwealth Federation in provincial Island politics. Though they had formed an association in 1936, they did not run any candidates provincially until this election. The CCF ran nine candidates throughout the Island and earned just over 2% of the popular vote, though no seats.

This election also took place during the Second World War.

Party Standings

Members Elected

The Legislature of Prince Edward Island had two levels of membership from 1893 to 1996 - Assemblymen and Councillors. This was a holdover from when the Island had a bicameral legislature, the General Assembly and the Legislative Council.

In 1893, the Legislative Council was abolished and had its membership merged with the Assembly, though the two titles remained separate and were elected by different electoral franchises. Assembleymen were elected by all eligible voters of within a district, while Councillors were only elected by landowners within a district.

Kings

Queens

Prince

Sources

1943 elections in Canada
Elections in Prince Edward Island
1943 in Prince Edward Island
September 1943 events